Following is a list of municipal presidents of Misantla, in the Mexican state of Veracruz:

References

Misantla